Safo, historia de una pasión is a 1943 Argentine erotic melodrama film directed by Carlos Hugo Christensen and starring Mecha Ortiz and Roberto Escalada. At the 1944 Argentine Film Critics Association Awards, Ortiz won the  Silver Condor Award for Best Actress for her performance as Selva in the film.

In a survey of the 100 greatest films of Argentine cinema carried out by the Museo del Cine Pablo Ducrós Hicken in 2000, the film reached the 43rd position.

Cast
Mecha Ortiz as Selva
Roberto Escalada as Raúl de Salcedo
Miguel Gómez Bao as Silvino
Nicolás Fregues as Dr. Benavídez
Guillermo Battaglia as Caudal
Ricardo Canales as Delavalle
Eduardo Cuitiño as Molina
Elisa Labardén as Teresa
Elisardo Santalla as Don Raimundo
Herminia Mancini as Langosta
Olga Zubarry as Fantasma en la fiesta de Carnaval
Ilde Pirovano as Gertrudis
Mirtha Legrand as Irene Benavídez
Aurora Sánchez

References

External links
 

1943 films
1940s Spanish-language films
Argentine black-and-white films
Films based on works by Alphonse Daudet
Films directed by Carlos Hugo Christensen
Argentine romantic drama films
1943 romantic drama films
1940s Argentine films